is a passenger railway station located in the city of Shimanto, Kōchi Prefecture, Japan. It is operated by the third-sector Tosa Kuroshio Railway and has the station number "TK41".

Lines and Trains
Only local trains stop at the station.

Layout
The station consists of a side platform serving a single elevated track. There is no station building, but an enclosed shelter is provided on the platform for waiting passengers. Access to platform is by means of a flight of steps. A bike shed and parking lots for cars are available near the base of the steps.

Adjacent stations

History

Passenger statistics
In fiscal 2011, the station was used by an average of 91 passengers daily.

Surrounding area
Shimanto Municipal Gudou Elementary School
Akamatsu housing complex
Shimanto Dragonfly Nature Park

See also
 List of railway stations in Japan

References

External links
 Station timetable

Railway stations in Kōchi Prefecture
Railway stations in Japan opened in 1997
Shimanto, Kōchi (city)